Junior Alexander Noguera Machuca (born 8 May 2002) is an Paraguayan professional footballer who plays as a midfielder for Paraguayan Primera División side Cerro Porteño.

Club career
Born in Caacupé, Noguera began his career with Cerro Porteño and made his professional debut with the club on 2 October 2020 against Sportivo San Lorenzo. He came on as a halftime substitute for Rodrigo Delvalle as Cerro Porteño drew the match 1–1.

International career
Noguera represented Paraguay at the 2019 South American U-17 Championship and the 2019 FIFA U-17 World Cup.

Career statistics

Club

References

2002 births
Living people
People from Caacupé
Paraguayan footballers
Association football midfielders
Cerro Porteño players
Paraguayan Primera División players